Herbert Bamlett (1 March 1882 – October 1941) was an English football manager and referee.

In 1909, Bamlett refereed the FA Cup fourth round tie between Manchester United and Burnley, but called the game off with only 18 minutes left and the score at 1–0 to Burnley due to heavy snow. United won the rearranged game 3–2 and went on to win the FA Cup for the first time. He also refereed the 1914 match between Scotland and England. At the end of that season, at the age of 32, Bamlett was appointed to referee the 1914 FA Cup Final between Liverpool and Burnley.

That same year, Bamlett took over as manager at Oldham Athletic, where he stayed for seven years before moving on to Wigan Borough (1921–1923) and Middlesbrough (1923–1926). After taking a break from the game, he was named manager of Manchester United in April 1927. He remained there until 1931, when his contract was not renewed following United's relegation. The club lost 12 consecutive matches that season and was strapped for cash after the death of owner John Henry Davies.

Managerial statistics

References

External links

Biographical profile

1882 births
1941 deaths
Sportspeople from Gateshead
English football managers
English football referees
Manchester United F.C. managers
Middlesbrough F.C. managers
Oldham Athletic A.F.C. managers
Wigan Borough F.C. managers